Blues Old Stand is an unincorporated community in Bullock County, Alabama, United States. The main road through the community is U.S. Route 29 in Alabama, but also includes Bullock County Roads 14 and 19. Blue Old Stand serves as the home of the Master Rack Hunting Lodge.

History
According to one account, Blues Old Stand was named for a man named Blue who kept a store known locally as the 'stand'.

References

Unincorporated communities in Bullock County, Alabama
Unincorporated communities in Alabama